Back from the Brink: Pre-Revolution Psychedelic Rock from Iran: 1973–1979 is a 2-CD/3-LP compilation album of Iranian songwriter, singer, and composer Kourosh Yaghmaei's solo material, released in 2011. It is a compilation of Yaghmaei's best-known numbers, recorded between 1973 and 1979, before the Islamic Revolution. The original sessions were produced by Kourosh Yaghmaei, while this anthology was produced by Egon for his Now-Again Records label.

Track list

CD version

Vinyl version

Personnel

Musicians

 Kourosh Yaghmaei – lead vocals; rhythm and acoustic guitars
 Behrooz Soori – bass guitar (A1, A2, A3, B2)
 Charlise Bet Davood – bass (B1)
 Fereydoon Farhoodi – bass (B4, D2, E1, F1)
 Kamran Yaghmaei – electric guitar (all but A4, B1, C3, D2, E3, F2, F4); rhythm guitar (B2, F2); acoustic guitar (C3); backing vocals (B1, C2, D3, E1, E3, F2); drums (A4, C3, F4)
 Farokh Hejazi – drums (A1, A2, A3, B2)
 Changiz Farjad – drums (B3, C1, C2, D1, D3, E1, E2, F1, F2, F3)
 Bardia – congas (F2); drums (D2)
 Behrooz Partovi – drums (E3)
 Houman Darioush – piano (A1)
 Siavash Ghomayshi – piano (A4)
 Mehrzad – keyboards (A2, A3, B2)
 Farhad – keyboards (B3)
 Fariborz Akhgar – keyboards (B4, D2, E1, F2)
 Behzad – congas (B3)
 Jamshid Sobhani – backing vocals (B1, E1), harmonica (F1)
 Yousuf Abgoun – backing vocals (E2)
 Amir Beheshti – trumpet (F4)
 Mirdadian – trumpet (F4)

Others
 Arranged By – Kambiz Yaghmaei (tracks: F4), Kourosh Yaghmaei (tracks: A1 to F3) 
 Errol F. Richardson  - art direction

References

External links

2011 compilation albums
Now-Again Records albums
Kourosh Yaghmaei albums
Albums produced by Kourosh Yaghmaei